The 163rd Infantry Division was a German Army infantry division in World War II. Formed in November 1939, it was engaged in the invasion of Norway the following year. It fought alongside the Finnish Army during Operation Barbarossa against the Soviet Union. During this time, the division's transit through neutral Sweden caused the Midsummer Crisis of 1941. The division spent most of the war in Finland, before being returned to Germany. It was destroyed in March 1945 in Pomerania by the First Polish Army, subordinated to the Soviet 1st Belorussian Front.

History
The 163rd Infantry Division was raised in November 1939. In April 1940 it was employed in the invasion of Norway, landing at Oslo, Kristiansand, Arendal, and Stavanger. It was troops from this division that was present on the heavy cruiser Blucher when it was sunk in the Battle of Drøbak Sound in the early hours of the invasion of Norway. Thereafter it remained on occupation duty in Norway until June 1941, when it was subordinated to the Finnish army to support operations along the River Svir during Operation Barbarossa.

In the early stages of Operation Barbarossa and the Continuation War the 163rd Division was to be transferred from Norway to Finland, and Sweden decided to allow safe transit of the division by railway through Swedish territory. The decision was in conflict with the Swedish neutrality-policy causing a political crisis (the "Midsummer Crisis" of 1941), and it raised many challenging questions about Sweden's neutrality during World War II. Today this remains a highly debated subject in Sweden and in the Nordic countries. The division was transferred 25 June to 12 July. In Swedish literature the division is better known as "Division Engelbrecht", after its commander at the time.
The transport took the route Charlottenberg-Laxå-Hallsberg-Krylbo-Ånge-Vännäs-Boden-Haparanda.

In February 1942 it joined the German XXXVI Mountain Corps near Kandalaksha, and remained there until the Germans withdrew from Finland back into Norway in autumn 1944. In early 1945 it was transferred back to Germany, standing in reserve for a time at Berlin, then destroyed by the Soviets in Pomerania in March.

Organization 
Structure of the division:

 Headquarters
 307th Infantry Regiment
 310th Infantry Regiment
 324th Infantry Regiment
 234th Artillery Regiment
 234th Reconnaissance Battalion
 234th Tank Destroyer Battalion
 234th Engineer Battalion
 234th Signal Battalion
 234th Field Replacement Battalion
 234th Divisional Supply Group

Commanding officers
General der Artillerie Erwin Engelbrecht, 25 October 1939 – 15 June 1942
General der Infanterie Anton Dostler, 15 June 1942 – 28 December 1942
Generalleutnant Karl Rübel, 29 December 1942 – 8 March 1945

See also 

 Operation Weserübung, Norwegian Campaign order of battle
 Continuation War
 German XXXVI Mountain Corps
 Division (military), Military unit, List of German divisions in World War II
 Heer, Wehrmacht

References

External links 
 Pipes, Jason. "163.Infanterie-Division". Retrieved April 9, 2005.
 Wendel, Marcus (2004). "163. Infanterie-Division". Retrieved April 9, 2005.
 "163. Infanterie-Division". German language article at www.lexikon-der-wehrmacht.de. Retrieved April 9, 2005.

German units in the Arctic
Continuation War
Military units and formations established in 1939
Military units and formations disestablished in 1945
Infantry divisions of Germany during World War II
1939 establishments in Germany